The Rugby Europe Women’s Under-18 Sevens Championship is an annual rugby sevens championship for women's under-18 national sevens teams in Europe. The championship is organised by rugby's European governing body, Rugby Europe.

History 
The growth of women’s Sevens has been boosted by the inclusion of rugby sevens in the Summer Olympics. 2014 was the inaugural European Under 18 tournament which began in September.

Tournaments

Championship

Trophy

References

External links 
 Official website

 
Women's rugby sevens competitions
Women
sevens
Women's rugby union competitions in Europe for national teams
2014 establishments in Europe
Recurring sporting events established in 2014